VK Crvena zvezda (full name: Vaterpolo klub Crvena zvezda) is a professional water polo club based in Belgrade, Serbia. It is part of the SD Crvena Zvezda sports society. As of 2021–22 season, it competes in the Serbian League, Regional League A1 and LEN Champions League.

History
VK Crvena zvezda won the 2012–13 LEN Champions League after beating Jug Dubrovnik 8–7 in the final. That was the first time that VK Crvena zvezda triumphed in the LEN Champions League. They finished the season in a brilliant way, after having won the Serbian League and the Serbian Cup. In the 2013–14 season, VK Crvena zvezda won the LEN Super Cup and successfully defended domestic double.

In 2016, due to financial troubles, VK Crvena zvezda decided to play its home matches at Zrenjanin City Pool.

Honours

Season by season

In European competition
Participations in Champions League: 7x
Participations in Euro Cup (LEN Cup): 5x

Current team

Notable squads
1991–92 squad
 Dragan Dobrić, Pino Dragojević, Viktor Jelenić, Igor Milanović, Dragoljub Milošević, Ratko Pejović, Dejan Perišić, Todor Prlainović, Nikola Ribić, Dragan Strugar, Vaso Subotić, Milan Tadić, Aleksandar Tičić, Jugoslav Vasović, Vladimir Vujasinović; Coach: Nikola Stamenić

1992–93 squad
 Aleksandar Ćirić, Dragan Dobrić, Čedomir Drašković, Viktor Jelenić, Dragan Kožul, Vladimir Mitrović, Dejan Perišić, Nikola Ribić, Vaso Subotić, Aleksandar Šapić, Milan Tadić, Aleksandar Tičić, Jugoslav Vasović, Vladimir Vujasinović; Coach: Milorad Krivokapić

2012–13 squad
 Denis Šefik, Strahinja Rašović, Nikola Rađen, Petar Ivošević, Mihajlo Milićević, Duško Pijetlović, Marko Avramović, Viktor Rašović, Sava Ranđelović, Boris Vapenski, Andrija Prlainović, Nenad Stojčić, Marko Draksimović, Nikola Eškert; Coach: Dejan Savić

2013–14 squad
 Denis Šefik, Strahinja Rašović, Nikola Rađen, Petar Ivošević, Filip Kljajević, Nikola Vukčević, Marko Avramović, Viktor Rašović, Sava Ranđelović, Boris Vapenski, Andrija Prlainović, John Mann, Marko Draksimović, Mihajlo Milićević; Coach: Dejan Savić

Notable players

  Dragan Solomun
  Ivica Tucak
  Igor Milanović
  Viktor Jelenić
  Vladimir Vujasinović
  Jugoslav Vasović
  Vaso Subotić
  Milan Tadić
  Aleksandar Ćirić
  Aleksandar Šapić
  Slavko Gak
  Branko Peković
  Nikola Janović
  Dejan Savić
  Gojko Pijetlović
  Duško Pijetlović
  Boris Vapenski
  Andrija Prlainović
  Nikola Rađen
  Marko Avramović
  Strahinja Rašović
  Viktor Rašović
  Sava Ranđelović
  Denis Šefik
  Gavril Subotić

References

External links
 
 
 
 VK Crvena zvezda Official Youtube channel

Crvena zvezda
Sports clubs established in 1945
Crvena zvezda
Crvena zvezda